The São Tomé kingfisher (Corythornis cristatus thomensis) is a bird in the family Alcedinidae. It is endemic to São Tomé, an island off the west coast of Africa in the Gulf of Guinea and was first described by the Italian ornithologist Tommaso Salvadori in 1902 under the binomial name Corythornis thomensis.  A molecular phylogenetic study published in 2008 showed that the São Tomé kingfisher is a subspecies of the malachite kingfisher.

References

Corythornis
Endemic birds of São Tomé and Príncipe
Birds described in 1902
Endemic fauna of São Tomé Island
Taxonomy articles created by Polbot